Chaika was a series of Soviet 35mm half-frame cameras produced by BELOMO from 1965 to 1974. The name came from call sign of the first woman in space - Valentina Tereshkova.
Over 2 million Chaika cameras were produced. All models of the Chaika cameras have metal cases.

Chaika cameras share the following basic specifications:
 Film used — 35-mm in standard cassette (135 type)
 Frame size — 18×24 mm
 Lens — Industar-69 (Tessar-type) ... mounted by LTM-like thread of 39 mm diameter.
 Focal length 28 mm
 Diaphragm scale from 2.8 to 16
 Focusing: 0.8 m to infinite
 Leaf shutter ... behind the lens
 Adjustable shutter speeds 1/30 - 1/250 sec and "B"
 Flash synchronisation
Flange focal distance for the lens was shorter than the standard M39 mount used by early Leica and compatible cameras - 27.5mm compared to 28.8mm for Leica - and the lens will not focus to infinity on such bodies. The intention was to use the lens to enlarge the negatives, not interchangeability with other cameras or lenses.

Camera models
Chaika (1965-1967)
Chaika-2 (1967-1972)
Chaika-2M (1972-1974)
Chaika-3 (1971-1973) with selenium lightmeter and without "B" speed

External links
Antique Soviet Camera: Chaika camera
Chaika group at flickr
Shutter Release Fix
Chaika 3 Half Frame for the Space Age
Adapting Chaika lenses to Micro Four Thirds system cameras

Cameras
Soviet cameras